Nijmegen railway station is the main railway station of Nijmegen in Gelderland, Netherlands. It was opened on 9 August 1865 and is located on the Tilburg–Nijmegen railway, Nijmegen–Venlo railway and the Arnhem–Nijmegen railway. It was extensively rebuilt after the war since the original station was severely damaged by a US bombing raid in February 1944 and during Operation Market Garden in September 1944. Until 1991 there was a line into Germany from here to Kleve.

The train services are operated by Nederlandse Spoorwegen and Arriva. The station is a central station for the whole area and is a busy interchange station.

Train services
, the following train services call at this station:
Express services:
Intercity: Den Helder - Alkmaar - Amsterdam - Utrecht - Arnhem - Nijmegen
Intercity: Schiphol Airport - Utrecht - Arnhem - Nijmegen
Intercity: Zwolle - Deventer - Arnhem - Nijmegen Oss - 's-Hertogenbosch - Breda - Roosendaal
Local services:
Sprinter: Arnhem - Nijmegen - Oss - 's-Hertogenbosch - Breda - Dordrecht
Sprinter: Zutphen - Arnhem - Nijmegen (- Wijchen)
Stoptrein: Nijmegen - Venlo - Roermond
Stoptrein: Nijmegen - Venray

Bus services

KLM Royal Dutch Airlines operates a bus from the train station to Schiphol Airport for KLM customers.

There is also an express bus service SB 58, operated by the German company NIAG to the German towns of Kranenburg, Kleve and Emmerich. The bus can be used with both Dutch OV-chipkaarts and German Verkehrsverbund Rhein-Ruhr tickets on the whole length of the route.

Breng is the main operator of local and regional bus services in the region, while Arriva also has one service connecting Nijmegen with Limburg.

References

External links
NS website 
Dutch Public Transport journey planner 

Railway stations in Nijmegen
Railway stations opened in 1865
Railway stations on the Maaslijn
1865 establishments in the Netherlands
Railway stations in the Netherlands opened in the 19th century